Celtis jessoensis, known as the Japanese hackberry or Jesso hackberry (from an archaic reading of "Ezo": Hokkaidō) is a species of hackberry native to Japan and Korea. It is a deciduous tree growing to 20–25 m tall. The leaves are 5–9 cm long and 3–4 cm broad, with a sharply serrated margin, glaucous beneath and downy on the leaf veins.

See also
Great purple emperor

References 

jessoensis
Flora of Japan
Flora of Korea
Trees of Japan
Trees of Korea